The 1989 National Camogie League is a competition in the women's team field sport of camogie was won by Kilkenny, who defeated Cork in the final, played at Nowlan Park. It was the first National League to be played under rules fixing the duration of matches at 60 minutes.

Arrangements
Kilkenny dropped three points early in the league campaign and an understrength team, minus Angela Downey lost to Cork by seven points. Kilkenny won their way back into contention when Dublin faltered and took their semi-final place at Dubln's expense. Both counties had big wins in the semi-finals, Kilkenny scored 6-8 against Galway in the semi-final and a weak Clare team failed to test Cork.

The Final
Angela Downey and Breda Holmes scored two goals each in the final for Kilkenny in the final.

Division 2
The Junior National League, known since 2006 as Division Two, was won by Kildare who defeated Armagh in the final on July 23.

Final stages

References

External links
 Camogie Association

National Camogie League
1989